XHUCAH-FM is a Mexican college radio station owned by the Universidad de Ciencias y Artes de Chiapas in Tuxtla Gutiérrez. It is known as UNICACH FM and broadcasts on 102.5 MHz.

History
XHUCAH received its permit in October 2012 and came to air on January 28, 2013, with test programming.

References

Radio stations in Chiapas
University radio stations in Mexico